Acraea kia is a butterfly in the family Nymphalidae. It is found in Tanzania, from the western part of the country to the Kigoma Region.

Taxonomy
It is a member of the Acraea terpsicore  species group   -   but see also Pierre & Bernaud, 2014

References

Butterflies described in 1990
kia
Endemic fauna of Tanzania
Butterflies of Africa